Sir Patrick Johnstone Ford, 1st Baronet (5 March 1880 – 28 September 1945) was a Scottish Unionist Party politician.

From around 1905 he was the main artistic patron of Patrick Adam.

For fought Edinburgh East as a Liberal Unionist at a by-election in 1909 and at the first general election of 1910, being defeated both times by the Liberal candidate in a straight fight.

Ford was elected as member of parliament (MP) for Edinburgh North on his first attempt, at a by-election in 1920. He was re-elected in 1922 general election, but was defeated in 1923 by the Liberal Party candidate Peter Raffan. He regained the seat at the 1924 general election, and held it until he stepped down at the 1935 general election.

Ford was made a Knight Bachelor in the 1926 New Year Honours, as well as being made a baronet of Westerdunes in the County of East Lothian on 27 July 1929. He was appointed Honorary Colonel of the Forth Heavy Brigade, Royal Artillery, on 26 June 1926.

He is buried with his wife and son near the centre of Dean Cemetery in Edinburgh.

References

External links 
 

1880 births
1945 deaths
Unionist Party (Scotland) MPs
Liberal Unionist Party parliamentary candidates
Baronets in the Baronetage of the United Kingdom
UK MPs 1918–1922
UK MPs 1922–1923
UK MPs 1924–1929
UK MPs 1929–1931
UK MPs 1931–1935
Members of the Parliament of the United Kingdom for Edinburgh constituencies